Golden Brother is a 2014 Hong Kong-Chinese romance comedy drama film directed by Shu Kai Chung. It was released in Hong Kong on September 18 and in China on December 24.

Cast
Bosco Wong
William Chan
Michael Tse
King Kong Lee
Stephy Tang
Zhao Rong
Rose Chan
Timmy Hung
Liu Kai-chi
Mini Kung
Angelina Lo
Emily Kwan
Benz Hung
Cheng Sze-kwan
Luk Wing-kuen
Ting Yu Chow
Edward Chui
Deep Ng
Angela Qiu

Reception
By December 25, 2014, the film had earned ¥13.76 million at the Chinese box office.

Awards and nominations

References

Notes
1.Given for the Traditional Chinese is the Cantonese translation, as 唔 is not used in Mandarin, with 不 being preferred in both Traditional and Simplified.

External links

2014 romantic comedy-drama films
Chinese romantic comedy-drama films
Hong Kong romantic comedy-drama films
2014 comedy films
2014 drama films
2010s Hong Kong films